The Schevkal campaign (1604–1605) was a military campaign by the Russian army against the Shamkhalate. These were the first Russian forces to come close to Dagestan since 1594. The Russians captured Tarki, but the Kumyks and their allies, under the command of Sultan Mahmud, routed the Russian army at the battle of Karaman. The Russian commander, Ivan Buturlin, was killed in the battle, along with 7000 Russian soldiers. The Shamkhalate of Tarki retained independence, and Russian expansion in Dagestan halted for 118 years.

References 

History of Dagestan
17th-century military history of Russia